María Asunción Begoña Fernández Fernández (published as Begoña Fernández) is a Mexican mathematician specializing in probability theory, stochastic processes, and mathematical finance. She is a professor of mathematics at the National Autonomous University of Mexico (UNAM).

Education
Fernández studied mathematics at UNAM, graduating in 1979. She earned a master's degree in statistics and operations research in 1986, and completed her doctorate at CINVESTAV in 1990.

Recognition
Fernández is a member of the Mexican Academy of Sciences.

References

External links

Year of birth missing (living people)
Living people
Mexican mathematicians
Mexican women mathematicians
Probability theorists
National Autonomous University of Mexico alumni
Academic staff of the National Autonomous University of Mexico
Members of the Mexican Academy of Sciences